The London and North Western Railway (LNWR) Claughton Class was a class of 4-cylinder express passenger 4-6-0 steam locomotives.

History
The locomotives were introduced in 1913, the first of the class No. 2222 was named in honour of Sir Gilbert Claughton, who was the Chairman of the LNWR at that time. A total of 130 were built, all at Crewe Works up to 1921.  Author Brian Reed points out that weight restrictions and equipment limitations at Crewe limited the size of the boiler, hence engine power.  Cylinder design and valve events were not optimal, so the Claughton Class was a mediocre performer on the track. 

The LNWR reused numbers and names from withdrawn locomotives, with the result that the numbering was completely haphazard. An exception was made for the LNWR's war memorial locomotives. There were two of these: No. 2097 (built in 1917) was briefly named Patriot for a short period in January 1920; and the name was later given to a new locomotive numbered 1914, which entered service in May 1920 (ordinarily, this locomotive would have been numbered 69, which had been unused since January 1920; but instead, Renown Class locomotive No. 1914 was renumbered 1257 in order to release its old number). The nameplates of both locomotives also bore the inscription "In Memory of the Fallen L & N W R Employees 1914–1919". Remembrance Day ceremonies at Rugby featured no. 1914 until its name was transferred to LMS Patriot Class No. 5500. The LMS renumbered them into the more logical series 5900–6029, No. 1914 becoming 5964. Twenty were rebuilt by the LMS with larger boilers, and ten of these had Caprotti valve gear.  Twelve others were rebuilt as the initial engines of the Patriot Class, though not much material was reused.

With the introduction of the LMS Royal Scot Class in 1927, the Claughtons' main work had been taken away and many were transferred to the Midland Division.
At the end of 1937, all but four, Nos. 5946, 6004, 6017 and 6023, had been withdrawn. These were retained in service until further repair became unworthwhile; three of them were withdrawn in 1940–41, leaving No. 6004, which was regularly used to haul fitted freight trains between London and Edge Hill, becoming increasingly dirty. Inherited by British Railways in 1948, it was allocated the BR number 46004 but was withdrawn in 1949 without it being applied. None were preserved.

Accidents and incidents
On 12 February 1929, locomotive No. 5977 was hauling an express passenger train that was in a head-on collision with a freight train at  station, Derbyshire. The driver and fireman of the express were killed.
On 6 March 1930, locomotive No. 5971 was hauling a passenger train that departed from  station, Cumberland against signals. Two people were killed and four were seriously injured.
On 13 March 1935, locomotive No. 5946 was hauling an express freight train which stopped in the section between Nash Mills and King's Langley signalboxes, Hertfordshire due to an engine defect. A milk train ran into the rear of it due to a signalman's error. Two other freight trains collide with the wreckage. One person was killed.

Details 

 † Locomotives fitted with larger boilers from 1928.
 ‡ Locomotives fitted with Caprotti valve gear and larger boilers from 1928.

References

 
 
 
 
 

 
 
 
 

Claughton
4-6-0 locomotives
Railway locomotives introduced in 1913
Standard gauge steam locomotives of Great Britain
Scrapped locomotives
Passenger locomotives